Danylo Serhiyovych Litovchenko (born 21 July 2000) is a Ukrainian professional footballer who plays as a central midfielder for Ukrainian club Mariupol.

References

External links
 
 

2000 births
Living people
Place of birth missing (living people)
Ukrainian footballers
Association football midfielders
FC Mariupol players
FC Yarud Mariupol players
Ukrainian Premier League players
Ukrainian First League players
Ukrainian Second League players